Corporation is a science fiction role-playing game created by Brutal Games. It has been inspired by many science fiction films and books, including The Fifth Element, Gattaca, Johnny Mnemonic, and Total Recall. The game makers have set up a forum for players to ask questions relating to the fictional world the game is set in, the rules, and even to discuss scenarios.

Games are often played in a cinematic style, with description, storytelling, and role-playing often more important than dice rolling.

History
Brutal Games published Corporation in 2009 through Mongoose Publishing's Flaming Cobra imprint. The game is available for purchase in book form and as PDF files.

Game world
Set in 2500 AD, the fictional world of Corporation is very different from that of today. Five corporations wield such power and influence that they can all but make their own laws. Following a long and savage war between the corporations in their rise to power, a large portion of the world had been left devastated and barely habitable; but from the ashes of this deeply scarred world has come a new era in human development. Citizens in the game world live peaceful lives in gleaming Spire Cities while mankind takes its first tentative steps in colonising the solar system. Since the end of the Corporate Wars, and the founding of the United International Government (UIG), there have been no global conflicts and crime has hit an all-time low.

Each Corporation seeks to shape the world to its own ideals, but enemies are always waiting to take advantage of an overextended competitor. Enter Agents, the roles the players take in a game of Corporation, who are cybernetically-altered and bio-modified humans, employing the most advanced technology money can buy. These men and women act as mid-level executives dealing with issues the Corporations cannot openly tackle.

Cities

Spire cities
Spires take many forms, from simple yet stunningly-tapered towers to immense pagodas and gnarled gothic constructs. A typical Spire houses about half-a-million Citizens and has a 20% commercial / 70% Citizen / 10% corporate makeup.

Open cities
Some cities were not damaged too badly in the wars and are still functioning. They are very much like the cities of the 21st century, with modern conveniences and problems. These are referred to as Open Cities, and many Citizens prefer them to the Spires, although they are harder to police and, so, in general have higher crime rates, more disease, and overall worse conditions. Two of the most famous Open Cities are Los Angeles (often called Nuevo Angelos) and Tokyo.

Relic cities
In times gone by, all nations had powerful religions, and many of the cities of the old world were organized around religious ideals. The Order of the Faith control several such cities and sites which once held great religious significance. These are known as Relic Cities and are the bastions and training grounds of the Order. The belief in these sacred places has been rekindled and the Devoted of the Order now guard their cities fiercely. Once again these places are as sacrosanct and revered as they once were. Relic Cities act as reservoirs of faith; the combined telepathic energies of the Faithful in these cities result in profound effects. These cities radiate power and instill into those who visit them a sense of awe.

Old cities
Where great cities once stood now lie wrecks. What are commonly referred to as Old Cities are now the last refuge of the poor and hunted. In 2231, the Shi Yukiro struck. They had finally mastered a perfect global defence and were able to attack without the fear of counterattack. They made unreasonable demands of the West, insisting on tithes of food and resources in exchange for safety from Japan’s D-Shift strikes. The West would not comply. This was one of the turning moments in the Corporate Wars, and the end result created the hazardous hell-holes which are the Old Cities.

This was, of course, not the case in Japan where their cities stood strong behind their defence systems. The UIG still technically in govern the Old Cities, but their efforts don't seem to go beyond policing them. Aside from the reduction of pollution, the UIG make few efforts to improve them. The sprawling cities grow in crude masses of scavenged parts and badly-built extensions. The weapons used in the wars were mainly designed to eliminate the populace, leaving the buildings untouched, so many of the Old Cities are structurally intact, but after decades of neglect and badly failing services they are little more than ruins.

Corporations
The Corporations have several roles in the game. Player characters are usually employed by one of the five Corporations. Other options, which will be expanded in later source books, are to be a Bounty Hunter, employed by the UIG (United International Government), or to be a citizen. 
Once a player has chosen an employer, other Corporations will be both enemies and allies, sometimes at the same time. Agents from other Corporations, controlled by the Gamesmaster, may be on their own missions, which have a positive or negative effect on that of the players, depending on the scenario.

The Corporations of the game world, with descriptions of their influences, outlook, and attitudes, are as follows.

The Ai-Jinn
The Ai-Jinn Corporation dominates a large area of mainland Asia of the game world. Their legitimate business practices revolve around the macro-structure and mining industries but their real strength is rooted in the seedy world of crime. Most Ai-Jinn Agents are criminals and have their roots within the world’s organised crime syndicates, such as Chinese triads, Japanese yakuza, Russian organisatziya, and American gangsters.

These associations create vast criminal networks which facilitate the Ai-Jinn’s activities and allow them to operate beyond the reach of the law. Ai-Jinn Agents often mix with the underworld, establishing gangs and setting up illegal businesses, while kidnapping, extorting, and blackmailing their way to success.

Comoros Alliance
Less of a Corporation and more of an organization, Comoros oversees the world’s health, education, and cultural integrity. They originally began as a necessary affiliation between India and Africa but over time have grown into one of the few superpowers who seem to have the well-being of humanity at the top of their agenda. Comoros’ power is a sleeping monster, their mastery over telepathics dwarfs that of the other Corporations. Although they seldom flex their muscles, when they do the results have been devastating.

This spiritual enlightenment comes at a price; Comoros are woefully underfunded and their merciful, altruistic tendencies have set them back in the technology war. As a result, they must buy most of their equipment from the other Corporations and operate on a stringent budget. Comoros Agents work with reduced cash and poor equipment but have access to a telepathic legacy few can claim. Their missions will be less immoral than those of the other Corporations and will tend to have an overriding theme of improving the world rather than exploiting it.

Eurasian Incorporated (E.I.)
Eurasian Incorporated specialise in the health and leisure industry, which generates enormous amounts of capital for them. Additionally, they are the best financiers in the world. Although they are easily the wealthiest of the corporations, the level of available cash brings with it decadence. Eurasian Incorporated Agents are flashy, well dressed, carefree, and unconcerned with the effects of collateral damage.

When a typical E.I. Agent is faced with a problem his default choices tend to be to blow it up or throw money at it. Although not every E.I. Agent thinks this way, so many do that, as a corporation, their operational skills tend to be less honed than their rivals. E.I. Agents can expect expense accounts, fast cars, tailored suits, and luxury accommodations.

Shi Yukiro
The Shi Yukiro Corporation combine the refined efficiency of modern Japan with the philosophies and rituals of their ancient ancestors. Their field of expertise lies in high-end technologies whose importance to the modern world has assured them an unshakable position among the game world superpowers.

Shi Yukiro Agents almost universally tend to have the greatest respect for their country and a strong sense of cultural identity. Their operational methods include stealth, high-tech surveillance, carefully deployed weaponry, and, of course, lightning displays of martial prowess. Shi Yukiro Agents mix the latest murderous technologies with codes of conduct dating back centuries. They act as the blackened knives of the Corporation, waiting in the darkness for any who would threaten their standing or impinge on their honour.

Western Federation
The Western Federation make the best weapons in the game world. That fact has ensured that in this day of universal warfare, they can count themselves one of the largest and most powerful corporations on the planet. Their territory spans all of North America and a significant part of South America, but as yet they have not expanded into the rest of the world.

Their policy is of old-fashioned values and clean living. Although heavily criticised by many, it has given them a strong hold on their resident population, who find the Federation’s way, although imperfect, to be a realistic and acceptable alternative to the poverty, crime, and squalor that is prevalent in much of the world. Federation Agents are well-paid and extremely well-armed. Federation divisions operate much like American Special Forces units and their mastery of military operations affords them a significant advantage in urban skirmishes. Their missions can range in scope as much as any Corporation's but tend toward "sweep and clean" or "seek and destroy".

The game system
The game system is the mechanics of the game. It lets a player character behave in a reasonably realistic manner. There is a wide and varied selection of different systems, the Corporation game uses one called Brutal.

Character creation
Character creation involves assigning points to seven statistics, or attributes: Agility (how physically able the character is), Endurance (how healthy and tough the character is), Intelligence (how well does the character learn, comprehend, remember, or know things), Perception (how aware the character is of their environment), Presence (how cool and intimidating the character is), Reflexes (how fast the character is), and Strength (how physically fit the character is).

Stats cost 1 point per level from a pool of 49 points. These Stats range from 1 to 10 (although Agents must have a minimum of 5, an average of 7, and a maximum of 10). Derived Stats like Hit Points (Strength + Endurance + 20 = HT) and Telepath Energy (Presence + Perception + Intelligence +10 = TE) are computed from adding the values some of the seven main Stats. Conviction, a player character Stat, gives the character a bonus in certain circumstances.

A player also assigns to their character set levels to a number of skills. There is a minimum of 1 and a maximum of 8 for a starting skill-level; a level of 0 means the skill is totally unknown and a level of 10 is total mastery.

There are 25 skills: Arts & Culture, Assess Technology, Athletics, Attitude, Business, Close Combat, Computers & Artificial Intelligence, Corporate Knowledge, Crime, Cybernetics & Robotics, Drive, Heavy Firearms, Light Firearms, Looking Good, Lying & Acting, Mechatronics, Medicine, Observation, Pilot, Psychology, Science, Stealth, Street Culture, Support Weapons, and Tactical Firearms.

Licenses are permits to do something that is controlled or restricted by the UIG (e.g., take combat drugs, have cybernetic implants, or perform sanctioned killing) or to become qualified at a professional skill (drive or fly a vehicle type, operate heavy weapons, etc.).

Trainings are specialized skills, much like the d20 System's Feats. Most are combat oriented.

Telepathics are psychic powers.

Skill rolls
During game play, a Gamesmaster will ask a player to make certain rolls on two 10-sided dice, with a target number based on the most appropriate choice of one Stat and one Skill. If the player rolls equal to or under this number they are successful in the action they had decided on.

Critical hits and misses involve double rolls of the dice.  A roll of double-1 means that something especially good has happened and the Gamesmaster can help the players out a bit. A roll of double 10 means that something bad has occurred, maybe a gun misfired, or you broke your hand punching through a wall. Circumstances such as quality of equipment or the profession of the Agent can alter which doubles are considered critical.

References

Websites
 Official site of Corporation
 Player comments about Corporation, from 2009
 Review of Corporation at www.gnomestew.com
 Review of Corporation at www.iguk.com
 Interview with James Norbury at www.geeknative.com
 Interview with James Norbury at www.gnomestew.com

External links
 Fansite forum with regular input from Brutal Games staff

Espionage role-playing games
Science fiction role-playing games
Cyberpunk role-playing games
Role-playing games introduced in 2009